Parevana is a village in the Churu district of Rajasthan, India. Its population is about 5000.

Villages in Churu district